The Fuliji–Jiahezhai railway is a railway line in Anhui and Jiangsu, China.

History
Construction on the project began in August 1958 and the railway was opened in three sections. The section between Fuliji and Suixi opened in February 1960. The section between Xiaoxian and Jiahezhai opened in May 1961. The final section between Daihe and Xiaoxian opened on 30 June 1966.

Songting railway station closed in 2018.

Specification
It starts at Jiahezhai railway station on the Longhai railway in the north and heads south, terminating at Fuliji railway station on the Beijing–Shanghai railway.

References

Railway lines in China
Railway lines opened in 1966